Vacation is the sixth and final studio album by American punk rock band Bomb the Music Industry!. It released on July 26, 2011 by Quote Unquote Records, Ernest Jenning, and Really Records.  It was announced in September 2010.

Much of the music was written while Jeff Rosenstock was on a free trip to Belize, and unlike the band's previous albums, it is "about trying to build a home."

There are guest contributions from members of Fake Problems, Bayside, Andrew Jackson Jihad, and Good Luck.

In a 2015 interview Rosenstock named Vacation as his favorite Bomb the Music Industry! album. Rosenstock said: Once I realized that we were orbiting punk in our own weird way, along with bands like Andrew Jackson Jihad and Good Luck and Laura Stevenson and the Cans and The Sidekicks, where we just kind of made records and weren't thinking about if they were punk or indie or whatever, we were just making records. That made this record have a bit of a different tone. I got the courage to say, "Fuck it, I'm going to make the record that I want to make and I know some people are going to not like it no matter what." No matter what, there's going to be reviews that say my voice is shitty. No matter what, the punk kids are going to say, "This is too slow, this used to be better, blah blah blah." So I was just going to keep on keeping on.

On August 2nd, 2021, Rosenstock released a collection of demos in honor of the album's ten year anniversary. Unlike the previously released Scrambles demos, this collection appears to feature other musicians. Like the Scrambles demos; a short piece of writing, detailing the creation of the album, was included.

Track listing
All songs written by Jeff Rosenstock except where noted.

Details
"Everybody That You Love" was originally released in summer 2010 as a single and demo versions of "Hurricane Waves" and "Can't Complain" were previously released in early 2011. All three songs were re-recorded for Vacation.

A clip from the 1993 film Airborne appears at the end of "Can't Complain."

The song "Can't Complain" was featured in episode twelve of the eighth season of The Office, "Pool Party".

Sponge Board / Baby Waves is a reference to a line from the surf movie Blue Crush.

Personnel

Main band
Mike Costa - Drums
John DeDomenici - Bass, Drums
Matt Keegan - Trombone, Synthesizer, Glockenspiel, Vocals
Tom Malinowski - Guitar, Vocals
Jeff Rosenstock - Vocals, Guitars, Saxophone, Keyboards, Programming, Drums

Additional personnel
Ginger Alford: Vocals
Neil Callaghan: Farfisa Organ
Chris Candy: Trumpet
Steve Ciolek: Vocals
Katie Cleary: Bass
Steven D'Agostino: Banjo
Chris Farren: Vocals
Ben Gallatty: Upright Bass
Chris Guglielmo: Drums
Mike Huguenor: Vocals
Aidan Kohler: Violins
Casey Lee: Pedal Steel
Sean McCabe: Mandolin, Tannerin
Lindsay McMullen: Cello
Dave Renz: Vocals
Matt Scheuermann: Vocals
Skylar Suorez: Vibraphone
Witt Wisebram: Harmonica

References

External links
Vacation on Quote Unquote Records

Bomb the Music Industry! albums
2011 albums